Yi Saenggang (born 1936), also known as Lee Saenggang, is a South Korean musician and a leading practitioner of daegeum sanjo, an instrumental style of Korean music played on the daegeum, a large bamboo transverse flute. His musical career spans over 60 years and he has been officially recognized as the master of Important Intangible Cultural Property by the Korean government.

External links
leesaengkang.com
"‘Taegum’ Maestro Celebrates 60-Year Musical Career" by Kim Ki-tae, The Korea Times, April 18, 2005, retrieved August 7, 2006

Living people
South Korean musicians
1936 births